Trenton is a city in Todd County, Kentucky, United States. The population was 384 at the 2010 census.

History
Settled as Lewisburg in 1796, and incorporated in 1840. The city was renamed after Trenton, New Jersey in 1819.

Geography
Trenton is located at  (36.723246, -87.261209).

Demographics

Notable people
Musician and activist Josephine Leavell Allensworth was born in Trenton.

References

External links

Cities in Todd County, Kentucky
Cities in Kentucky
Populated places established in 1796
1796 establishments in Kentucky